Somchai Wongsawat (born 31 August 1947)  is a Thai politician who was the prime minister of Thailand in 2008 and a former executive member of the People's Power Party (PPP) whose political rights were disenfranchised by the Constitutional Court (ConCourt) for five years.

Prior to entering electoral politics, he had served civil service and judicial service, having been appointed Permanent Secretary of Justice (the highest non-elected position in the civil service) in 2000 by the government of Chuan Leekpai. Following his retirement from office in 2006 owing to the pensionable age, he entered politics after the 2006 coup unseating the government of his brother-in-law, Thaksin Shinawatra. He joined the PPP which won the December 2007 parliamentary elections, becoming Minister of Education and Senior Deputy Prime Minister. After the premiership of Samak Sundaravej had been terminated by the ConCourt for contravening the conflict of interests law, Somchai was successfully nominated Prime Minister.  His government had to deal with the 2008 Thailand political crisis as well as the global financial crisis of 2008, and the PPP was eventually dissolved by the ConCourt and its executive members, including Somchai, were prohibited from politics for five years for vote-buying committed by Yongyuth Tiyapairat.

Family life
Somchai was born at Amphoe Chawang, Nakhon Si Thammarat Province, a son of Mr. Choem and Mrs. Dap (Sutsai) Wongsawat. He is a brother-in-law of former prime minister Thaksin Shinawatra and former prime minister Yingluck Shinawatra, having married their sister Yaowapha. The couple have three children, Mr. Yotchanan Wongsawat, Ms. Chinnicha Wongsawat and Mrs. Chayapha Nam.

Somchai's wife Yaowapha previously served as an MP in the Thai Rak Thai Party led by her older brother, Thaksin Shinawatra. Like one hundred and ten other members of the party, she was banned from participating in politics for a five-year period by the order of the Constitutional Tribunal because of the party's violation of election laws.

Education
Somchai completed his primary education in his home town, and his secondary education at Amnuay Silpa School in Bangkok.  He received a bachelor of law from Faculty of Law, Thammasat University in 1970, becoming a barrister-at-law of the Thai Bar Association in the next three year. He achieved his master of Public Administration from the National Institute of Development Administration in 2002.

Career

Public service
Somchai has been appointed to various offices in the juridical service and the civil service, including inter alia: assistant judge of the Ministry of Justice in 1974, ministerial justice in the next year, justice of Chiang Mai's Provincial Court in 1976, justice of Chiang Mai in 1978,  justice of Chiang Rai in 1983, chief of the Bench of Phang Nga's Provincial Court in 1986, chief of the Children and Juvenile Court of Rayong in 1987, chief of Chon Buri's Provincial Court in 1988 and of Nonthaburi's Provincial Court in the next year, and  chief of the Bench of Thon Buri's Criminal Court in 1990, respectively. Somchai held office as judge of the 3rd Region's Appealate Court in 1993 and chief of the Bench of the 2nd Region's Appealate Court in 1997.

In 1998 Somchai was appointed as the Deputy Permanent Secretary of Justice for Academic Affairs, and later for Administrative Affairs.  He became the Permanent Secretary of Justice on 11 November 2000, and was transferred to become the Permanent Secretary of Labor from 8 March to 30 September 2006, the date he retired from the public service after reaching pensionable age.

Somchai has been since appointed inter alia chairperson of the law committee of the National Research Council of Thailand, member of the Thai Bar Association's committee, member of the Board of Thailand's Electricity Generation Authority, member of the Board of the Narcotics Prevention and Suppression Board, member of the Money Laundering Prevention and Suppression Board, member of the committee of the Council of State of Thailand, member of the Board of Policy of the National Thai Police, member of the Civil Service Board of Thailand, member of the Juridical Service Board of Thailand, and member of the National Official Information Board of Thailand.

Premiership
A member of the People Power Party, he was the deputy leader of the Party in 2007 and held office as the Minister of Education in the Next Year and Senior Deputy Prime Minister.

Somchai became the prime minister on 9 September 2008, upon the Constitutional Court's decision that the premiership of Samak Sundaravej had been terminated for his having worked as the emcee of two cooking shows while in office, in violation of the law forbidden government ministers from holding any other paid employment.

On 17 September 2008, Somchai was elected prime minister of the country by the National Assembly, receiving 298 favourable votes, more than the 163 votes for Abhisit Vejjajiva.

King Bhumibol Adulyadej issued a Royal Proclamation appointing Somchai as the 26th Prime Minister on 18 September 2008.

Siege
On 7 October 2008, anti-government protesters attempted to hold 320 parliamentarians and senators hostage inside the Parliament building, cutting off power. Somchai Wongsawat escaped by climbing a rear fence after his policy address. Other legislators were trapped inside. The 6-week sit-in and siege on the area next to the prime minister's office led the government to transfer its activities temporarily to Don Muang. Eventually, Somchai authorised the police to use force against the demonstrations. Thousands were injured, some seriously, and two protestors died, one a young woman; both were killed by exploding police gas grenades, which also maimed a number who lost limbs.

Investigation
On 29 September, Thailand's Election Commission spokesman Ruangrote Jomsueb said a subcommittee would investigate Somchai (30 days probe, to the Constitutional Court) per Senator Ruangkrai Leekijwattanaon's complaint on "whether Somchai violated the constitution by holding shares in Thailand's CS LoxInfo PCL, an Internet service provider that is a contract partner of CAT Telecom, a state-owned telecommunications service provider." The Thai constitution bars parliament members from holding shares in companies that do business with state enterprises, and if found guilty, Somchai would be disqualified as parliament member and ousted as prime minister.

Neglected duty and removal
On 17 October, Thailand's anti-corruption body found Prime Minister Somchai Wongsawat guilty of neglecting his duties while working in the justice department eight years ago. Members of the National Counter Corruption Commission said Somchai was wrong to suspend a corruption investigation into two senior officials while he was a permanent secretary at the justice ministry in 2000. The NCCC's investigation followed a complaint lodged by senior judge Chamnan Rawiwanpong after he petitioned for an investigation into alleged corruption involving a land sale in Pathum Thani province in 2000.

After the petition, Somchai set up a disciplinary panel, accusing Chamnan of serious wrongdoing and recommending he be fired, prompting Chamnan to make the counter-complaint.

Somchai Cabinet
The Cabinet was active from 18 September 2008 – 2 December 2008.

References

|-

1947 births
Somchai Wongsawat
Living people
Somchai Wongsawat
Somchai Wongsawat
Somchai Wongsawat
Somchai Wongsawat
Somchai Wongsawat
Somchai Wongsawat
Somchai Wongsawat
Somchai Wongsawat
Recipients of the Order of the Sun of Peru
Somchai Wongsawat